Kriegsdorf may refer to:
Hodod, Romania, known in German as Kriegsdorf
a district of Troisdorf, in North Rhine-Westphalia, Germany
the pre-war name of Friedensdorf, in Saxony-Anhalt, Germany